William Macmahon Ball, AC (29 August 1901 – 26 December 1986) was an Australian academic and diplomat. Born in Casterton, Victoria, he was educated at Caulfield Grammar School and the University of Melbourne, where he received a Bachelor of Arts degree, Ball studied both psychology and political science as a research fellow at Melbourne and the London School of Economics respectively. He then travelled Europe as a Carnegie Travelling Fellow, and during the Munich crisis was the first foreigner allowed to visit Sachsenhausen concentration camp in several years.

He was a notable diplomat, working as an advisor to the Australian delegation at the San Francisco conference of the United Nations in 1945, Australian Minister to Japan, and British Commonwealth representative to the Allied Conference.

He later became a professor of political science at Melbourne University, and was a regular broadcaster on both the ABC and BBC. He was made a Companion of the Order of Australia in 1978 "for service to education and learning particularly in field of political science".

See also
 List of Caulfield Grammar School people

References

External links
William Macmahon Ball - The University of Melbourne 150 Years: 150 Stories
Guide to the Papers of William Macmahon Ball - National Library of Australia

Further reading
 Peter Ryan, William Macmahon Ball: A Memoir (1990)
 Ai Kobayashi, W. Macmahon Ball: Politics for the People (2013)
 

1901 births
1986 deaths
Ambassadors of Australia to Japan
University of Melbourne alumni
Alumni of the London School of Economics
People educated at Caulfield Grammar School
Companions of the Order of Australia
Australian political scientists
People from Casterton, Victoria
20th-century political scientists